The Belarusian Greek Catholic Church (Bielaruskaja hreka-katalickaja carkva BHKC) sometimes called in reference to its Byzantine Rite liturgy the Belarusian Byzantine Catholic Church, is one of the 23 Eastern Catholic sui iuris particular churches in full communion with the Catholic Church and the Pope of Rome. It is the heir within Belarus to the Union of Brest and Ruthenian Uniate Church.

History
The Christians who, through the Union of Brest (1595–96), entered full communion with the See of Rome while keeping their Byzantine liturgy in the Church Slavonic language, were at first mainly Belarusian. Even after further Ukrainians joined the Union around 1700, Belarusians still formed about half of the group. According to the historian Anatol Taras, by 1795, around 80% of Christians in Belarus were Greek Catholics, with 14% being Latin Catholics and 8% being Orthodox.

Russian Empire 
The partition of Poland–Lithuania and the incorporation of the whole of Belarus into Russia led, according to the Russian Orthodox Church, many Belarusians (1,553 priests, 2,603 parishes and 1,483,111 people) to unite, by March 1795, with the Russian Orthodox Church. Another source seems to contradict this, since it gives the number of parishes that came under Russian rule in 1772 only as "over 800", meaning that many priests and people remained in communion with Rome.

After the unsuccessful 1830-1831 November Uprising against Russian rule and the subsequent removal of the predominantly Catholic local nobility from influence in Belarusian society, the three bishops of the Church, along with 21 priests, convoked in February 1839 a synod that was held in Polatsk on 25 March 1839. This officially brought 1,600,000 Christians and either 1,305 or some 2,500 priests to join the Russian Orthodox Church.

However, some priests and faithful still refused to join. The Russian state assigned most of the property to the Orthodox Church in the 1840s, and some priests emigrated to Austrian Galicia, while others chose to practise in secret the now-forbidden religion.

20th century 
When, in 1905, Tsar Nicholas II published a decree granting freedom of religion, as many as 230,000 Belarusians wanted union with Rome. However, since the government refused to allow them to form a Byzantine-Rite community, they joined the Latin Church, to which most Belarusian Catholics now belong.

After the First World War, the western part of Belarus was included in the reconstituted Polish state, and some 30,000 descendants of those who, less than a century before, had joined the Russian Orthodox Church joined the Catholic Church, while keeping their Byzantine liturgy. In 1931, the Holy See sent them a bishop as Apostolic Visitator. After the Soviet Union annexed West Belarus in 1939, an exarch for the Belarusian Byzantine-Rite faithful was appointed in May 1940, but two years later, he was arrested and taken to a Soviet concentration camp, where he died.

Cold War 
While from then on very little information about the Byzantine Catholics in Belarus could reach Rome, refugees from among them founded centres in western Europe (Paris, London and Louvain) and in parts of the United States of America, especially in Chicago. From 1947, Leo Haroshka initiated in Paris a pastoral and cultural periodical called Bozhym Shliakham (Божым Шляхам), which was published from 1960 to the end of 1980 in London. In London also, Alexander Nadson began translating the Byzantine liturgical texts into the Belarusian language in the 1970s. Thanks to this work, when in 1990 the first Greek-Catholic parishes could be organized in Belarus, they were able immediately to use these texts in their national language.

In 1960, the Holy See appointed Cheslau Sipovich as Apostolic Visitator for the Belarusian faithful abroad. He was the first Belarusian Catholic bishop since the Synod of Polatsk. A successor, Uladzimir Tarasevich, was appointed in 1983. After his death in 1986, Alexander Nadson was appointed Apostolic Visitator, but not, at his own request, raised to episcopal rank.

Dissolution of the Soviet Union 
The 1980s saw a gradual increase in interest among Minsk intellectuals in the Greek-Catholic Church. Articles by Anatol Sidarevich and Jury Khadyka about its history appeared in the 1987-1988 issues of Litaratura i Mastastva. And in the autumn of 1989 some young intellectuals of Minsk decided to publish the periodical Unija intended to promote the rebirth of the Greek-Catholic Church.

In early 1990, Nadson brought humanitarian aid from Belarusians abroad to their compatriots at home still suffering as a result of the 1986 Chernobyl disaster. He was surprised to meet young Belarusians who said they were Greek Catholics. On 11 March, he celebrated Minsk's first Divine Liturgy in the national language, and, two days later, had a meeting with the editors of Unija, the first issue of which was then printed in Latvia.

September 1990 saw the registration of the first Greek-Catholic parish since the Second World War, and in early 1991 Jan Matusevich began to celebrate the liturgy in his Minsk apartment. He was later put in charge of all the Greek-Catholic parishes in Belarus, and died in 1998.

Republic of Belarus 
By 1992, three priests and two deacons in Belarus were celebrating the Byzantine liturgy in Belarusian. The same year, a survey by Belarus State University found that 10,000 people in Minsk identified themselves as Greek Catholics. By 1993, it was estimated that the number of Greek Catholics in Belarus had grown to 100,000.

Extrapolated to the country as a whole, this was interpreted to mean that, especially among the intelligentsia and nationally conscious youth, some 120,000 Belarusians were in favour of a rebirth of the Greek-Catholic Church. Because of the lack of priests and churches this interest did not lead to membership.

In 1994 Pope John Paul II appointed Sergiusz Gajek Apostolic Visitor for Greek Catholics in Belarus.

Present situation
At the beginning of 2015, the Belarusian Greek Catholic Church had 20 parishes, of which 18 had obtained state recognition. As of 2003, there have been two Belarusian Greek Catholic parishes in each of the following cities - Minsk, Polatsk and Vitsebsk; and only one in Brest, Hrodna, Mahiliou, Maladziechna and Lida. The faithful permanently attached to these came to about 3,000, while some 7,000 others lived outside the pastoral range of the parishes. Today there are 16 priests, and 9 seminarians. There was a small Studite monastery at Polatsk. The parishes are organized into two deaneries, each headed by a protopresbyter or archpriest.

Two of the parishes had small churches. Some of the others had pastoral centres with an oratory.

Belarusian Greek Catholics abroad, numbering about 2,000, were under the care of Mitred Protopresbyter Alexander Nadson as Apostolic Visitator until his death in 2015. The chief centres are the Church of St Cyril of Turau and All the Patron Saints of the Belarusian People in London and parish in Antwerp (constituted in 2003).

A parish in Chicago, that of Christ the Redeemer, existed from 1955 to 2003. It was founded by John Chrysostom Tarasevich and was served by Deacon Vasili von Burman; the noted historian of the Russian Greek Catholic Church. Christ the Redeemer was later the home parish of Uladzimir (Vladimir) Tarasevich until his death, after which it was administered by the local Latin Catholic ordinary, who appointed first Joseph Cirou and then John Mcdonnell as administrators. On 7 September 1996, the parish had seen the ordination of Prince Michael Huskey, EOHS as the first Belarusian deacon in the United States. Michael served in the parish until it was closed by Cardinal Francis George, Archbishop of Chicago, on 20 July 2003.

See also
Belarusian Autocephalous Orthodox Church
Catholic Church in Belarus
Synod of Polotsk

References

Sources 
Belarusian Catholic Mission (Byzantine rite) in London
History of the Greek Catholic Church in Belarus by Alexander Nadson
 The history of the Uniate Church and its disestablishment in the 19th century.
 Oriente Cattolico (Vatican City: The Sacred Congregation for the Eastern Churches, 1974)
 Annuario Pontificio
 Ronald Roberson, CSP; The Eastern Christian Churches: A Brief Survey (6th edition); 1999; Edizioni Orientalia Christiana, Pontificio Istituto Orientale; Rome, Italy; 
Archimandrite Siarhiej Hajek: The Belarusian Greek Catholic Church Yesterday and Today (Greek translation published in instalments on Καθολική (Athens), beginning with the issue of 25 July 2006)
1780—1800-я гады: рэлігійная канверсія беларускіх уніятаў

 
Eastern Catholicism in Belarus
Christian denominations established in the 20th century
Christian organizations established in 1990
1990 establishments in the Soviet Union